Cyprinid herpesvirus 3 (also CyHV-3, koi herpes virus or KHV) is a species of virus causing a viral disease that is very contagious to the common carp Cyprinus carpio.

Pathology
It is most commonly found in ornamental koi, which are often used in outdoor ponds or as feeder stock. The first case of KHV was reported in 1998, but not confirmed until later in 1999.

KHV is a DNA-based virus. After discovery, it was identified as a strain of herpesvirus. Like other strains, KHV stays with the infected fish for the duration of their lives, making the recovered and exposed fish potential carriers of the virus. Koi fish infected with KHV may die within the first 24–48 hours of exposure. The virus is found in 33 countries.

KHV is listed as a nonexotic disease of the EU, so is watched closely by the European Community Reference Laboratory for Fish Diseases.

Symptoms of KHV include:
 Gill mottling
 Red and white patches appearing on gills
 Bleeding gills
 Sunken eyes
 Pale patches
 Blisters

Changes in the specimen's behaviour may also indicate the presence of KHV. Behavioural symptoms may include disorientation, hyperactivity and potentially isolation, in which the specimen detaches themselves from the shoal.

Use as a biological control agent
In 2016 the Australian Government announced plans to release the virus into the Murray-Darling basin in an attempt to reduce the number of invasive common carp in the water system. However in 2020 this plan was found to be unlikely to work.

References

External links

 Invading Species.com Ontario Ministry of Natural Resources and the Ontario Federation of Anglers and Hunters
 Koi Herpes Virus (KHV) Disease. Institute of Food and Agricultural Sciences Fact Sheet VM-149, University of Florida.
 K.H.V. Koi Herpes Virus. National Fish Pharmaceuticals
 European Community Reference Laboratory for Fish Diseases
 Carp herpesvirus - Managing Water Ecosystems - CSIRO

Carp
Fish viral diseases
Alloherpesviridae